Justin Zanik (born 1975) is the general manager of the Utah Jazz.

Zanik has been a certified NBAPA since 2003.

He and his wife, Gina, have three children, Ava, Oskar and Lucy.

Early life and career 
Zanik grew up in Missouri, and attended Northwestern University to earn a B.A. degree in Economics from 1993-98. While in college, Zanik was a member of the Delta Tau Delta fraternity and initially a major in music opera before pivoting to economics. 

Zanik met player agent Mark Bartelstein, founder of Priority Sports and Entertainment, while volunteering as a coach of a sixth-grade basketball team. 

Zanik's first job after college was Priority Sports and Entertainment (1998-2002) as VP of basketball operations where he managed European contract negotiations in the Chicago Office. While working for Priority Sports, he met his wife, Gina, who also worked with the company. Zanik then served as a sports agent for basketball clients at ASM Sports (2003-13), assistant general manager of the Utah Jazz (2013-16), assistant general manager of the Milwaukee Bucks (2016-17) under GM John Hammond, and assistant general manager (again) for the Utah Jazz (2017-19) which had remained vacant during the span of Zanik’s absence.

Utah Jazz 
In his first year back with the Utah Jazz, Zanik worked alongside GM Dennis Lindsey and assistant GM David Morway to add key players such as Royce O'Neale and Georges Niang. 

In the summer of 2019, Zanik was involved in the signing of Bojan Bogdanovic and trading for Mike Conley. Zanik told Bogdanovic, “Your toughness, your ability to space the floor, contribute to the group … all the little things that you did in Indiana last year, especially after being able to carry the team the last three or four months really made an impression on us.”

On May 10, 2019, Justin Zanik was named new GM for the Utah Jazz, taking over the vacancy left by Dennis Lindsey who was promoted to EVP of basketball operations.  Zanik helps facilitate contract negotiations, manage salary caps and oversee scouting of prospects, as well as other  responsibilities.

Zanik brought in chef Anthony Zamora,  one of three registered dietitians working for an NBA team, to the Zion Bank Basketball Campus training facility giving personalized meal plans upon request.

See also 
List of National Basketball Association general managers

References

Living people
National Basketball Association executives
1975 births